My Very Own Circus is a 2020 Canadian comedy-drama film directed by Miryam Bouchard. The film stars Jasmine Lemée as Laura, a young girl who has spent years living an itinerant lifestyle with her circus clown father Bill (Patrick Huard) and his stagehand Mandeep (Robin Aubert), but longs for a more conventional and stable life; she is given an opportunity to chase her own dreams when her teacher Patricia (Sophie Lorain) recognizes her academic potential and helps her to secure admission to a private boarding school, challenging her relationship with her father.

The film was inspired in part by Bouchard's own experience as the daughter of a circus performer, although she has clarified that it should not be interpreted autobiographically.

The film premiered in theatres on August 14, 2020.

Awards

References

External links

2020 films
2020 comedy-drama films
2020s coming-of-age comedy-drama films
2020s French-language films
Canadian coming-of-age comedy-drama films
Quebec films
Films set in Quebec
Films shot in Quebec
French-language Canadian films
2020s Canadian films